Rocchetta a Volturno is a comune (municipality) in the Province of Isernia in the Italian region Molise, located about  west of Campobasso and about  west of Isernia.

Rocchetta a Volturno borders the following municipalities: Castel San Vincenzo, Cerro al Volturno, Colli a Volturno, Filignano, San Biagio Saracinisco, Scapoli, Vallerotonda.

The village contains two main settlements. The older part, called Rocchetta Alta, lies on the top of a rocky hill that dominates the valley. The old town is deserted since the end of the 20th century. The new town is at the bottom of the hill, in the valley.

References

External links
Rocchetta a Volturno - Sito ufficiale Turismo

Cities and towns in Molise